The Association for Software Testing, commonly referred to as the AST, is dedicated to advancing the understanding of the science and practice of software testing according to context-driven principles.  AST's membership consists of scholars, students and practitioners who are interested in the advancement of the field of software testing.  The group was founded in the United States in 2004 by Cem Kaner.

AST has multiple objectives, including:
 Fostering cross-pollination of ideas between scholars, students and practitioners.
 Hosting an annual conference focused on cross-community information sharing.
 Promoting ethical behavior for all software testers.
 Supporting peer workshops related to software testing.

Conference 
The AST's first conference, named "CAST" for the Conference of the Association for Software Testing, was held in Indianapolis, Indiana in 2006 and had the theme "Influencing the Practice".

 CAST 2007 had a theme of "Testing Techniques: Innovations and Applications" and was held in Bellevue, Washington, USA
 CAST 2008 had a theme of "Beyond the Boundaries: Interdisciplinary Approaches to Software Testing" and was held in Toronto, Ontario, Canada
 CAST 2009 had a theme of  "Serving Our Stakeholders" and was held in Colorado Springs, Colorado
 CAST 2010 had a theme of "Skills in Testing" and was held in Grand Rapids, Michigan.
 CAST 2011 had a theme of "Context-Driven Testing" and was held in Seattle, Washington.
 CAST 2012 had a theme of "The Thinking Tester" and was held in San Jose, California.
 CAST 2013 had a theme of "Lessons Learned" and was held in Madison, Wisconsin.
 CAST 2014 had a theme of "The Art and Science of Testing" and was held in New York City, New York.
 CAST 2015 had a theme of "Moving Testing Forward" and was held in Grand Rapids, Michigan.
 CAST 2016 had a theme of "Testing: Software Development Catalyst" and was held in Vancouver, Canada
 CAST 2017 had a theme of "What the heck do testers really do?" and was held in Nashville, Tennessee, USA

Training 
The AST offers a series of online training courses in black box software testing (BBST), based on videos from Florida Institute of Technology's Center for Software Testing Education & Research (CSTER) with additional study aids and support from live instructors.

The initial set of courses enhances materials developed under a series of grants from the National Science Foundation. These materials are used in traditional university courses and in courses for practitioners, such as those offered by AST. The AST courses run 4 weeks each and focus on a single topic or test technique. AST is planning new courses by additional instructors.

See also 
Up to date information on the Executive Committee, and Board of Directors can be found here.

External links 
 
 
Cem Kaner, Rebecca L. Fiedler, & Scott Barber, "Building a free courseware community around an online software testing curriculum."  MERLOT conference, Minneapolis, August 2008.

References 

Information technology organizations based in North America
Software testing